Koyo Kouoh (born 1967) is Cameroonian-born curator who has been serving as Executive Director and Chief Curator of the Zeitz Museum of Contemporary Art Africa in Cape Town since 2019. In 2015, the New York Times called her "one of Africa’s pre-eminent art curators and managers." She lives and works in Cape Town and Dakar.

Early life and education
Having grown up in Douala Kouoh studied business administration and banking in Switzerland as well as cultural management in France. She is fluent in French, German, English and Italian.

Career
Inspired by Margaret Busby’s anthology of writings by women of African descent, Daughters of Africa (1992), Kouoh jointly edited a German-language equivalent, Töchter Afrikas, that was published in 1994. 

In 2001 and 2003, Kouoh served as co-curator – alongside writer Simon Njami – on Bamako Encounters (Rencontres de Bamako), a photography biennial held in Mali.

From 2008 until 2019, Kouoh served as the founding artistic director of RAW Material Company, a center for art, knowledge and society in Dakar. She was also the curator of the education programme at 1:54 Contemporary African Art Fair in London. 

Kouoh has served as curatorial advisor for documenta 12 (2007) and 13 (2012), co-curated Les Rencontres de la Photographie Africaine in Bamako in 2001 and 2003 as well as collaborated in different capacities with the Dakar Biennial. In February 2014, she was entrusted by the European Union and the Senegalese Ministry of Culture with the development of a thorough reform of the Dakar biennial. She later served as curator of the 2016 edition of EVA International, the Republic of Ireland's biennial of contemporary art. She was on the search committee that chose the Polish curator Adam Szymczyk as artistic director for documenta 14 in 2017.

Since 2019, Kouoh has been serving as Executive Director and Chief Curator of the Zeitz Museum of Contemporary Art Africa in Cape Town, South Africa.

In 2020 she received The Swiss Grand Award for Art / Prix Meret Oppenheim. The Award was founded in 2001 and honors figures from the worlds of art and architecture as well as criticism, curation, and research whose work is of particular relevance and importance for contemporary art and architecture in Switzerland and beyond.

Exhibitions
Kouoh's discursive programs, exhibitions and publications have included contemporary artists, thinkers, photographers, writers, activists, non-artists, designers, collectors, politicians, architects, curators and chefs. Specializing in photography, video and art in the public space, she has curated numerous exhibitions internationally and written on contemporary African art. Her most recent projects include Body Talk: Feminism, Sexuality and the Body in the Work of Six African Women Artists, Personal Liberties, a program composed of three exhibitions, seminars, talks, screenings and an upcoming publication looking at sexuality in Africa, homosexuality and homophobia, Condition Report on Building Art Institutions in Africa, a collection of essays resulting from the eponymous symposium held in Dakar in January 2012, Word!Word?Word! Issa Samb and the undecipherable form, the first monograph dedicated to the work of seminal Senegalese process-oriented artist Issa Samb. Besides a sustained theoretical and exhibition program at RAW Material Company, she maintains a dynamic international curatorial activity.

Other activities
 Goethe-Institut, Member of the General Meeting
 German Academic Exchange Service, Member of the Board
 The Vera List Center for Art and Politics at The New School, Member of the 2018-2020 Prize Jury 
 Celeste Prize, Member of the Board
 Zeitz Museum of Contemporary Art Africa, Member of the Curatorial Advisory Group (2018-2019)

References

Cameroonian art curators
Living people
1967 births
Cameroonian women curators
21st-century Cameroonian women
20th-century Cameroonian women